Ricky Brad Sobers (born January 15, 1953) is a former professional basketball player who spent eleven seasons in the National Basketball Association (NBA).

A 6'3" guard born in the Bronx, New York, Sobers attended DeWitt Clinton High School in New York City, the College of Southern Idaho, and the University of Nevada at Las Vegas before being selecting by the Phoenix Suns with the 16th pick of the 1975 NBA draft.  Sobers played two seasons for the Suns.  In the 1976 Finals, Sobers was a key player in "the greatest game ever played" in NBA history.  In 1977, he joined the Indiana Pacers, with whom he averaged a career best 18.2 points per game during the 1977–78 NBA season.

Sobers also played with the Chicago Bulls, Washington Bullets, and Seattle SuperSonics before retiring in 1986.  He compiled 10,902 points and 3,525 assists in his career.

References

External links
Career Stats @ basketball-reference.com

1953 births
Living people
20th-century African-American sportspeople
21st-century African-American people
African-American basketball players
American men's basketball players
Basketball players from New York City
Chicago Bulls players
DeWitt Clinton High School alumni
Indiana Pacers players
Phoenix Suns draft picks
Phoenix Suns players
Point guards
Seattle SuperSonics players
Southern Idaho Golden Eagles men's basketball players
Sportspeople from the Bronx
UNLV Runnin' Rebels basketball players
Washington Bullets players